Robert D. Marcus is a business executive in the communications industry. He was the former CEO of Time Warner Cable.

Biography
Marcus was born to a Jewish family and graduated magna cum laude from Brown University. He went on to earn a J.D. from the Columbia Law School.

Career
Marcus practiced law at Paul, Weiss, Rifkind, Wharton & Garrison for seven years. Marcus was also director of TW Telecom, and editor of the Columbia Law Review.

Marcus joined Warner Bros. parent company Time Warner (now WarnerMedia) in 1998. He held the role of Chief Operating Officer of Time Warner Cable. He was responsible for Time Warner Cable's derivation from Time Warner and its shift to a publicly traded company.

Marcus also worked as President, Senior Executive Vice President, Senior Vice President of Mergers and Acquisitions, Acting Chief Financial Officer, Chief Financial Officer, Head of Business Strategy Development and Treasurer, Senior VP of Content Businesses, Executive VP of Business Development and VP of Mergers and Acquisitions.

In 2014, Marcus was the CEO and Chairman of Time Warner Cable until the company was purchased by Charter Communications in May 2016.

In October 2016, the United States Senate Judiciary Antitrust Subcommittee mistakenly announced that Marcus was being called to testify before Congress in regards to a proposed merger of Time Warner and AT&T.

Marcus serves on the board of directors of Equifax.

References

Living people
Brown University alumni
Columbia Law School alumni
20th-century American Jews
Paul, Weiss, Rifkind, Wharton & Garrison people
American chief executives in the media industry
American chief operating officers
American chief financial officers
American corporate directors
Equifax people
1965 births
21st-century American Jews